Magnus Zirath (born 16 February 1981) is a retired Swedish ice hockey goaltender. Zirath played for Djurgårdens IF in the Swedish Hockey League, during the 1999–2000 season, in which the team was Swedish ice hockey champions. Zirath made one appearance for Sweden's Under-18 national team in the 1999 IIHF World U18 Championships.

Career
Zirath started playing youth hockey with IFK Tumba and played for Huddinge IK in J20 SuperElit. In February 2000, Zirath joined Djurgårdens IF.

References

1981 births
Djurgårdens IF Hockey players
Living people
Swedish ice hockey goaltenders